Saint Duthac (or Duthus or Duthak) (1000–1065) is the patron saint of Tain in Scotland.

According to the Aberdeen Breviary, Duthac was a native Scot. Tradition has it that Duthac was educated in Ireland and died in Tain.

A chapel was built in his honour and a sanctuary established at Tain by the great Ferchar mac in tSagairt, first Earl or Mormaer of Ross in the thirteenth century, and was ministered by the Norbertine canons of Fearn Abbey. A century later, this sanctuary was notably breached by English supporters who captured Robert the Bruce's wife, daughter and sisters sheltering in the chapel. The chapel was burnt later in political violence between regional power groups, namely the Clan MacKay and the Clan Ross.  The ruins of the chapel still exist as a centrepiece of St Duthus Old Burial Ground on the shores of the Dornoch Firth.

Saint Duthac was greatly venerated in Scotland and his memory is still preserved in variations, in the names of places and organisations, including Kilduthie; Arduthie near Stonehaven and Kilduich on the Loch Duich.  Tain, where he is reputed to have died and been buried, had the Church built in his honour. His death is recorded in the "Annals of Ulster" for the year 1065. After many years his body was found to be incorrupt and his relics were translated to the shrine at St. Duthus Collegiate Church built between 1370 and 1458. The ruins of the St Duthus Church are still there but the relics disappeared c1560 at the time of the Reformation.

Veneration
St Duthac was known as the Chief Confessor of Ireland and Scotland (Dubtach Albanach) and his saint's feast day is 8 March.  His shrine was visited multiple times by King James IV, Robert the Bruce and his family, and other notable pilgrims.

Tain was called Baile Dhubhthaich in Scottish Gaelic or Duthac's Town and near it stands St. Duthac's Cairn, although the biennial Fairs called by his name are no longer held in the town.

References

Bibliography
 Boyle, Alexander, "Notes on Scottish Saints," in The Innes Review, Spring 1981, pp. 66–7
See the Acta Sanctorum and KSS pp. 328–329

Further reading

Alban Butler The Lives of the Saints. London: Burns Oates, 1956.  
Various publications published by Morgan Publications, 11 Arden Drive, Dorridge, Solihull B93 8LP, UK.

1000 births
1065 deaths
Medieval Gaels from Scotland
People from Tain
People from Ross and Cromarty
11th-century Christian saints
Medieval Scottish saints
Canonizations by Pope Leo XIII